Col Brown is an Australian former professional rugby league footballer who played in the 1960s and 1970s.

Early life
Brown was born in Belmore, Sydney, and played his junior rugby league for Lakemba United. Brown is one of four brothers to have played for Canterbury.

Playing career
Brown made his first grade debut for Canterbury in 1960 against rivals Parramatta. Over the coming years, Brown became a regular in first grade and in 1967 the club reached its first grand final in a number of seasons defeating 11-year reigning premiers St George in the process. In the 1967 grand final against Souths, Brown started at hooker as Souths lead the match early on by a score of 5–2. Canterbury then regained the lead to be ahead 8-5 until Brown tried a looping pass which was intended to find Les Johns only for Souths player Bob McCarthy to intercept the ball and race away to score a try. Souths then went on to kick a late goal to win the match 12–10. Brown went on to play a further three seasons for Canterbury and retired at the end of 1970. Brown was later made a life member of the club after retirement.

References

1938 births
Canterbury-Bankstown Bulldogs players
Living people
Rugby league hookers
Rugby league locks
Rugby league players from Sydney